Kisch is a surname. Notable people with the surname include:

Egon Kisch (1885–1948), Austrian and Czechoslovak writer and journalist
Enoch Heinrich Kisch (1841–1918), Austrian balneologist and gynecologist
Frederick Kisch (1888–1943), British Army officer and Zionist leader
Royalton Kisch (1920–1995), British conductor

See also
Kisch, Illinois, an unincorporated community in Cass County, Illinois, United States